(), also known as Chinese shoes, Chinese-style embroidered shoes, and Chinese slippers, are a well-known sub-type of traditional Chinese cloth shoes; the  are deeply rooted in Chinese culture and are characterized by its use of elaborate and colourful Chinese embroideries to create pattern on the shoes (including the shoe cover from heal to toe, the sole of the shoes, and even the shoe padding). The traditional handicraft of making  is fully indigenous to China, having been created by Chinese people since the ancient times, and combines Chinese shoe culture and the art of Chinese embroidery. This craft is believed to have originated during the Spring and Autumn period about 2600 years ago in Shanxi province; the traditional craft was then handed down from generation to generation by Chinese women.

Cultural significance and tradition 

Chinese cloth shoes has a history of more than 3000 years; and, although cloth shoes are rare in urban areas of China nowadays, this form of shoes remain an important irreplaceable aspect of Chinese along with Confucianism and Buddhism. 

Chinese embroideries have reflected and expressed the subtle changes in aesthetic concepts, cultural traditions, ethics and morals of the Chinese people throughout the millennia. Similarly, the  also reflect Chinese aesthetics through the use of beautiful embroidery patterns in the shoe cover.

Tradition 
The  worn by women was thus also known  at this period.

In the past, Han Chinese brides' sewing skills were best reflected in the making of shoes.

United States 

In the early 20th century, the  manufactured in China were imported to the United States where they were sold in American stores to American women as boudoir shoes; none of this imported  were sold to Chinese people.

Related items 

Tiger-head shoes
 Lotus shoes
 Manchu platform shoes

See also 

 Hanfu
 Hanfu footwear

References

External links 
 DIY production of Xiuhuaxie

Chinese folk art
Shoes
Chinese footwear